Andrzej Klimaszewski is the name of:

 Andrzej Klimaszewski (canoeist) (born 1954), Polish sprint canoer
 Andrzej Klimaszewski (long jumper) (born 1960), Polish long jumper